The Professional Regulation Commission, otherwise known as the PRC, is a three-man commission attached to Department of Labor and Employment (DOLE). Its mandate is to regulate and supervise the practice of the professionals (except lawyers, who are handled by the Supreme Court of the Philippines) who constitute the highly skilled manpower of the country. As the agency-in-charge of the professional sector, the PRC plays a strategic role in developing the corps of professionals for industry, commerce, governance, and the economy.

Short history
The Commission was created with the signing of Presidential Decree No. 223 on June 22, 1973 by President Ferdinand E. Marcos. The first PRC Commissioner, Architect Eric C. Nubla assumed office on January 2, 1974.

The PRC Coat-of-Arms designed by the Heraldry Commission was officially adopted on February 1, 1974. The Commission made its offices at the burned Civil Service Commission building at P. Paredes Street in Manila. The structure later became the PRC Main Building. The PRC began issuing certificates of registration in Filipino with English translation. Proclamation No. 1276 is issued declaring June 22 to 29, 1974 as "Professional Consciousness Week."

1974 also saw the computerization of the database of registered professionals with the assistance of the National Computer Center. The Implementing Rules and Regulations of P.D. 223 are promulgated on December 9 of that year.

In 1975, PRC began issuing computer-printed registration cards with one-year validity. PRC starts accrediting professional organizations.

1986 saw the Hon. Julio B. Francia assume office as Commission Chairman and launch drive against graft and corruption. During his term the Chairman & a member of the Board for Deck Officers were caught to be checking wrong answers (273 examinees from Master to Third Mate) resulting in their termination as Board Members and suspension of examination for two years for the 273 whose answer sheets were marked.

In 1992, Atty. Hermogenes P. Pobre assumes office as third Commission Chairman.

The PRC Vision and Mission is adopted during the Annual Planning Conference in 1998.

In 1999 the commission was formally awarded ISO 9002 certification by the Anglo-Japanese-American Environmental Quality and Safety Certification Services for the licensing and certification of marine deck and engineer officers.

2001 saw Commissioner Alfonso G. Abad assume office as Acting Chairman in February. The Implementing Rules and Regulations of R.A. 8981 are adopted on February 15. Hon. Antonieta Fortuna-Ibe assumed office as the first lady Chairperson on August 1.

Former Philippine Court of Appeals Justice Nicolas P. Lapeña Jr formally assumed office on August 26, 2008, as Chairman of the PRC succeeding Dr. Leonor T. Rosero, who finished her term last July. He joins incumbent PRC Commissioners Nilo L. Rosas and Ruth Raña Padilla.
 
Without finishing his term, Chairman Nicolas P. Lapeña Jr. retired on December 31, 2010. Commissioner Antonio S. Adriano assumed as Officer-in-Charge from January 1 to 9, 2011. Atty.Teresita R. Manzala assumed office as the new PRC Chairperson on January 10, 2010. The New Chairperson joins Commissioner Alfredo Y. Po and Commissioner Jennifer J. Manalili, who replaces Commissioner Nilo L. Rosas and Commissioner Antonio S. Adriano, respectively. After the retirement of Chairman Teofilo S. Pilando last August  2022. Commissioner Jose Y. Cueto assumed as Officer in Charge of the Commission. President Bongbong Marcos appointed Atty. Charito A. Zamora as the new PRC Chairperson for a term of seven years. Commissioners Jose Y. Cueto, Jr.  and Erwin M. Enad received the new Chairperson with a warm welcome and smiles of hope.

Functions

Executive
Administer, implements, and enforces the regulatory policies of the national government, including the maintenance of professional and occupational standards and ethics and the enforcement of the rules and regulations relative thereto.

Quasi-Judicial
Investigates cases against erring examinees and professionals. Its decisions have the force and effect of the decisions of a court of law, with the same level of authority as a Regional Trial Court. After the lapse of the period within which to file an appeal, Commission decisions become final and executory.

Quasi-Legislative
Formulates rules and policies on professional regulation. When published in the official gazette, these rules have the force and effect of law.

Mandate
"Nurture Filipino professionals towards technical proficiency and civic responsibility in the service of the Filipino nation"

Republic Act 8981, otherwise known as the "PRC Modernization Act Of 2000", mandates the following:
Institutionalization of centerpiece programs
full computerization
careful selection of Professional Regulatory Board members, and
monitoring of school performance to upgrade quality of education
Updating of organizational structure for operational efficiency and effectiveness;
Strengthening of PRC's enforcement powers, including regulatory powers over foreign professionals practicing in the country;
Authority to use income for full computerization; and
Upgrading of compensation and allowances of Chairperson to that of a Department Secretary and those of the Commissioners to that of Undersecretary.

Regulated professions
Under the Commission are the forty-three (43) Professional Regulatory Boards which exercise administrative, quasi-legislative, and quasi-judicial powers over their respective professions. The 43 PRBs which were created by separate enabling laws, perform these functions subject to review and approval by the Commission:

Prepare the contents of licensure examinations. Determine, prescribe, and revise the course requirements
Recommend measures necessary for advancement in their fields
Visit / inspect schools and establishments for feedback
Adopt and enforce a Code of ethics for the practice of their respective professions
Administer oaths and issue Certificate of Registration
Eligibility to Work at any Government offices whether National or Local.
Investigate violations of set professional standards and adjudicate administrative and other cases against erring registrants 
Suspend, revoke, or reissue Certificate of Registration for causes provided by law

Professional Regulatory Boards 

Agriculture

Agriculture

Architecture and Design

Architecture
Interior Design
Landscape Architecture
Master Plumbing

Business

Accountancy
Real Estate Services

Communication and Information Science

Library Science

Education

Professional Teaching

Engineering

Aeronautical Engineering
Agricultural and Biosystems Engineering
Chemical Engineering
Civil Engineering
Electrical Engineering
Electronics and Communications Engineering
Geodetic Engineering
Mechanical Engineering
Metallurgical Engineering
Mining Engineering
Naval Architecture and Marine Engineering
Sanitary Engineering

Health Sciences

Dentistry
Medical Technology
Medicine
Midwifery
Nursing
Nutrition and Dietetics
Optometry
Pharmacy
Physical Therapy
Occupational Therapy
Radiologic Technology and X-ray Technology
Respiratory Therapy
Food Technology

Natural Sciences

Chemistry
Environmental Planning
Fisheries Technology
Forestry
Geology
Veterinary Medicine

Public Administration

Customs brokerage

Social Sciences

Criminology
Guidance and Counseling
Psychology
Psychometrics
Social Work

Accredited Professional Organization (APO)

Agriculture

 Philippine Association of Agriculturists, Inc. (PAA)

Architecture and Design

 National Master Plumbers Association of the Philippines (NAMPAP)
 Philippine Association of Landscape Architects (PALA)
 Philippine Institute of Interior Designers (PIID)
 United Architects of the Philippines (UAP)

Business

 Philippine Association of Realty Consultants and Specialists (PARCS)
 Philippine Institute of Certified Public Accountants (PICPA)

Communication and Information Science

 Philippine Librarians Association, Inc. (PLAI)

Engineering

 Geodetic Engineers of the Philippines (GEP)
 Institute of Electronics Engineers of the Philippines, Inc. (IECEP)
 Institute of Integrated Electrical Engineers of the Philippines, Inc. (IIEE)
 Philippine Institute of Chemical Engineers (PIChE)
 Philippine Institute of Civil Engineers (PICE)
 Philippine Society of Agricultural Engineers (PSAE)
 Philippine Society of Mechanical Engineers (PSME)
 Philippine Society of Mining Engineers (PSEM)
 Philippine Society of Sanitary Engineers (PSSE)
 Society of Aerospace Engineers of the Philippines (SAEP)
 Society of Metallurgical Engineers of the Philippines (SMEP)
 Society of Naval Architects and Marine Engineers (SONAME)

Health Sciences

 Integrated Midwives Association of the Philippines (IMAP)
 Integrated Philippine Association of Optometrists, Inc. (IPAO)
 Nutritionist-Dietitians' Association of the Philippines (NDAP)
 Philippine Association of Medical Technologists (PAMET)
 Philippine Association of Radiologic Technologists (PART)
 Philippine Dental Association (PDA)
 Philippine Medical Association (PMA)
 Philippine Nurses Association (PNA)
 Philippine Pharmacists Association, Inc. (PPHA)
 Philippine Physical Therapy Association (PPTA)

Natural Sciences

 Geological Society of the Philippines (GSP)
 Integrated Chemists of the Philippines (ICP)
 Philippine Institute of Environmental Planners (PIEP)
 Philippine Society of Fisheries, Inc. (PSF)
 Philippine Veterinary Medical Association (PVMA)
 Society of Filipino Foresters (SFF)

Public Administration

 Chamber of Customs Brokers (CCB)
 Philippine Association of Community Development (PACD)

Social Sciences

 Philippine Association of Social Workers, Inc. (PASWI)
 Philippine Guidance Counseling Association, Inc. (PGCA)
 Professional Criminologist Association of the Philippines (PCAP)
 Psychological Association of the Philippines (PAP)

See also
Department of Labor and Employment (Philippines)
Professional Regulatory Board of Architecture
Integrated Bar of the Philippines

References

2. Text of Republic Act 8981

External links

PRC Board Exam Results

Quasi-judicial bodies
Professional associations based in the Philippines
Department of Labor and Employment (Philippines)